Puzeh Bali-ye Boland (also Romanized as Pūzeh Balī-ye Boland; also known as Pūzeh Balūţ-e Boland) is a village in Chin Rural District, Ludab District, Boyer-Ahmad County, Kohgiluyeh and Boyer-Ahmad Province, Iran. At the 2006 census, its population was 99, in 23 families.

References 

Populated places in Boyer-Ahmad County